Zama Airport  was located near Zama City, Alberta, Canada. It is located outside of Zama City. Farther away is the Zama Lake Airport, which is near Zama Lake.

See also
Zama Lake Airport

References

External links
Page about this airport on the Canadian Owners and Pilots Association's Places to Fly

Defunct airports in Alberta